The siege of Vladimir was part of the Mongol invasion of Rus.

Prelude 
After the destruction of Ryazan on December 21, 1237, Grand Prince Yuri II left the capital city of Vladimir in charge of his son Vsevolod and fled to Yaroslavl, seeking help from his cousins, Princes of Rostov and Novgorod. However, the speed of the Mongols was such that Kolomna fell barely 10 days after Ryazan, and Moscow only 3 weeks later, leaving the people of Vladimir to fend for themselves.

Siege 
The defense of Vladimir was entrusted to the Grand Prince's sons Vsevolod and Mstislav, but their forces were weak, as most of the army perished at the siege of Kolomna, hoping to stop the invaders on the border. Thus, after receiving word of the destruction of Kolomna in January 1238, Bishop Mitrofan let most of the citizens take monastic vows in order to prepare for their imminent death. After weak resistance the city was taken on February 8, 1238.

Aftermath 
Receiving word of the siege of Vladimir, Grand Prince Yuri II attempted to reach the city and break the siege, but his small army was surrounded and defeated at the Battle of the Sit River.

References

Vladimir
Vladimir
Vladimir
1238 in Europe
Vladimir
13th century in Russia
Vladimir